These are lists of roads in the United Kingdom.

United Kingdom
List of numbered roads in the British Isles
List of motorways in the United Kingdom
List of road junctions in the United Kingdom
List of primary destinations on the United Kingdom road network
List of road projects in the UK

Great Britain

In Great Britain roads are numbered according to a zonal scheme:

A roads

B roads

Other
List of roads that are incorrectly numbered

Northern Ireland
List of A roads in Northern Ireland
List of B roads in Northern Ireland

See also 

 Odonymy in the United Kingdom

 

United Kingdom transport-related lists